Arnold Carl Earley (June 4, 1933 – September 29, 1999) was an American professional baseball player and left-handed pitcher in Major League Baseball.  He was born in Lincoln Park, Michigan, where he attended Lincoln Park High School.

Career
He appeared in eight seasons in the major leagues with the Boston Red Sox (1960–65), Chicago Cubs (1966) and Houston Astros (1967). Signed by the Red Sox as an amateur free agent in 1952, he did not make his major league debut until 1960 at age 27. He missed the 1954 and 1955 seasons while serving in the United States Army.

He appeared in 223 major league games (all but ten as a relief pitcher) and had a lifetime record of 12–20 with 310 strikeouts, 85 games finished and 14 saves. As a starting pitcher, he threw one complete game: on July 15, 1964, he defeated the contending Chicago White Sox, 11–2, at Fenway Park, allowing only four hits. In 381 career innings pitched, Earley surrendered 400 hits and 188 bases on balls. His lifetime earned run average was 4.48 for an Adjusted ERA+ of 87. His best season was  when he played in 25 games for the Red Sox and had an earned run average of 2.68 and an Adjusted ERA+ of 143.

Death
Arnold Earley died at age 66 in Flint, Michigan, in 1999.

References

External links

1933 births
1999 deaths
Albany Senators players
Allentown Red Sox players
Baseball players from Michigan
Boston Red Sox players
Chicago Cubs players
Greensboro Patriots players
Houston Astros players
Indianapolis Indians players
Major League Baseball pitchers
Memphis Chickasaws players
Minneapolis Millers (baseball) players
Oklahoma City 89ers players
Oklahoma City Indians players
People from Lincoln Park, Michigan
Richmond Braves players
Roanoke Ro-Sox players
Seattle Rainiers players
Tacoma Cubs players